Dominick MacCabe was an Irish politician. He was an independent member of Seanad Éireann from 1938 to 1948. He was first elected to the 2nd Seanad in 1938 by the Agricultural Panel. He was-elected at the 1943 and 1944 Seanad elections but lost his seat at the 1948 Seanad election.

References

Year of birth missing
Year of death missing
Irish farmers
Members of the 3rd Seanad
Members of the 4th Seanad
Members of the 5th Seanad
Independent members of Seanad Éireann